Camp Hill, near Spartanburg, South Carolina, is the site of a plantation house built by Dr. John Winsmith in 1835. It was listed on the National Register of Historic Places in 1970.

It had originally been the camp site of British Major Patrick Ferguson prior to the Battle of Kings Mountain, October 17, 1780.  This was an important Patriot victory in the Southern campaign of the American Revolutionary War. Frontier militia overwhelmed the Loyalist militia led by Major Ferguson.  In The Winning of the West, Theodore Roosevelt wrote of Kings Mountain, "This brilliant victory marked the turning point of the American Revolution."

References

Houses on the National Register of Historic Places in South Carolina
Greek Revival houses in South Carolina
Houses completed in 1835
Houses in Spartanburg County, South Carolina
National Register of Historic Places in Spartanburg County, South Carolina